is a short composition for organ by French composer Olivier Messiaen.

Background 

The Monodie was composed in 1963 at the request of Jean Bonfils, who was Messiaen's assistant at the church of the Sainte-Trinité, Paris, where he was the main organist. It was written for Bonfils's and Noémie Pierrot's organ method book entitled Nouvelle méthode de clavier. Messiaen presumably didn't have his own organ at the Trinité because of a major refurbishment. It was then published as a part of that book in 1963 by the Schola Cantorum. Musicologist Nigel Simeone alleges that Messiaen could have composed the Monodie as a part of a sight-reading examination at the Schola Cantorum. The piece was later republished posthumously by Éditions Alphonse Leduc in 1997, as most other short works that were lost, forgotten, or never intended for publication. It was formally premiered on May 19, 1998, at Westminster Cathedral, in London, with Gillian Weir at the organ.

Structure 

This composition has a total duration of 6 minutes and a total of 17 bars of variable length. As was customary in many works by Messiaen, the monodie has no time or key signature. It starts with a single staff (as opposed to a three-staff system, which is typical of organ works). Messiaen used the tempo marking "Très modéré". The stop configuration used in the piece is stable throughout: Flute 8 (or Quintaton 16), Cor de Nuit 8, Nazard 2⅔, and Octavin 2. The piece features multiple triplets, quintuplets and sextuplets.

Recordings 

Following is a list of some of the most notable recordings:

References 

Compositions by Olivier Messiaen
1963 compositions
Compositions for organ